Muscle strain is one of the most common injuries in tennis. When an isolated large-energy appears during the muscle contraction and at the same time, bodyweight applies huge amounts of pressure to the lengthened muscle, which can result in the occurrence of muscle strain. Inflammation and bleeding are triggered when muscle strain occur which resulted in redness, pain and swelling. Overuse is also common in tennis players from all levels. Muscle, cartilage, nerves, bursae, ligaments and tendons may be damaged from overuse. The repetitive use of a particular muscle without time for repair and recover in the most common case among the injury.

Types of injuries

Lateral epicondylitis 

Lateral epicondylitis is an overuse injury that frequently occurs in tennis. It is also known as tennis elbow. This injury categorizes as a tendon injury where it occurs in the forearm muscle called the extensor carpi radialis brevis (ECRB). The injury is regularly developed in recreational players. Experienced players are less likely to develop lateral epicondylitis than the inexperienced players due to poorer technique. 	Tennis elbow or lateral epicondylalgia is a common injury that occurs in 40-50% of tennis players. It is more prominent at the lower levels of play and usually comes from any incorrect use of the wrist or grip on the forehand or one-handed backhand strokes  Players at higher levels often have more relaxed grips and have a larger racquet extension out to the ball after they make contact, where professionals have less emphasis on the arm and more on the use of every part of the body in order exert the natural power behind the ball, lower level players don’t always receive the training on how to use their whole body for a tennis stroke and are often reduced to using their arms in order to exert all of the power, therefore putting heavy strain on the arm. Holding the grip tightly will put more tension on the arm therefore when going for a swing the muscles will be absorbing all of the shock from the initial contact of the ball. Symptoms of tennis elbow includes slow pain, which occurs around the elbow. Simple tasks such as shaking hands or moving the wrist with force, like lifting weights or doing push ups, will worsen the pain Tennis Elbow  has actually shown that inflammatory tendons are only part of the early stages or acute stages with a treatment of anti-inflammatory or steroids being appropriate uses for this symptom. Most players respond well to simple rest, but other means of treatment include physical therapy, strength training, and electrical stimulation. Some players will make alterations to their racquet, such as increasing their grip size which will ultimately prevent any unwanted movement of the wrist when extending out and finishing the tennis stroke.

Shoulder 
Shoulder injury is another common type of tennis injury. Shoulder injuries are caused by the repetitive use of shoulder when serving and striking the ball. The injury also relevance to rotator cuff pathology, toscapular dyskinesis or glenohumeral internal rotation deficit which leads to internal impingement and/or labral pathology. There is 24% of the high-level tennis players aged 12–19 suffered from shoulder pain and rise up to 50% for middle-aged players. A way to prevent shoulder injury is to flex and stretch the wrist with an exercise band three to four times a week and to stretch properly before playing a game.

Back   

It is common for tennis players, at all levels of play, to have experienced back injury throughout their career. In fact, more than 85% of the active athletes clarified that they have experienced back pain. According to 148 professional tennis player in one particular study, back pain forced 39% of players to withdraw from the tournament. Furthermore, 29% of the players said they experienced chronic back pain. Lower back pain is another common injury amongst tennis players with instances of postural abnormalities and general overuse which may occur during the back rotation and extension of the serve. In order to relieve pain in the lower back people are often told to rest it, but no longer than two days because of its potential damage to the bones, connecting tissue, and cardiovascular system. Once the back pain has dispersed stretching is recommended in order to prevent the stiffness from the initial pain, with examples being the squatting position or spinal extensions. In order to prevent future lower back injuries strength training to the abdominal muscles is necessary to strengthen the abdomen, and to protect the back from excessive intervertebral disk strain. The straight crunch, the Oblique crunch, and balance exercises with the gym ball are some of the workouts for abdominal strengthening, but the exercises should be done with caution to prevent any further back strain. After the injury is dealt with, players at any level may return to the court, the higher level players will often go through proper stretching before any matches to prevent hurting their back or any other part of their body.

Blister 
Blister can be described as a patch that appears on the skin and is filled with a clear fluid and sometimes blood. During physical activities, the continuous force of friction, cutting, squeezing and scratching, which causes the separation of the epidermal cell layer, as a result the blister is formed. Blister (foot) occurs frequently among marathon runners, walk racers, backpackers and in hiking. In tennis, the blister development site often occurs on the hand or around the fingers because the skin is consistently rubbing against the tennis racquet. Blisters can also occur on the backside of the feet due to wearing the wrong sized shoe, worn out shoes, too thin of socks, or improper foot work.

Leg 
Tennis leg is the most common tennis injury within older tennis players. Tennis leg is an incomplete tear or rupture of the calf muscle. The injury is noticed right away by hearing a popping sound, or a jabbed feeling in the leg. The injury is very painful; players are unable to finish their match if injury occurs. After injury occurs, players should rest, ice, compress, and elevate injury. In most cases, physical therapy is required. Physical therapy lasts from a four to six week period; includes running, stretching, and jumping drills to strengthen the muscle. After recovery, returning to play is slow; prevention includes proper stretching and warmup before play, rolling out muscles, and cross training, such as, Pilates, cycling, or running.

Knee 
Patellar tendinopathy is an overuse injury of the patellar tendon. Its more common name is Jumper’s knee. Common injury in tennis players due to constant jarring, jumping, and quick changes of motion while in play. Common symptoms are pain below the knee cap, or an aching pain after playing. Recovery for Jumping knee includes strengthening the thigh muscle, stretching the front and back of the thigh, hamstrings, quadriceps, and coordination training.

Another more permanent knee injury is chondromalacia. Unlike jumper’s knee, this injury is unreversible. Symptoms are pain in the front of the kneecap. This condition is due to the gradual breakdown of the cartilage in the knee.

Stress Fractures 
Stress fractures are considered one of the most common injuries in athletes. In tennis, stress fractures are due to repetitive jarring and excessive submaximal loads on bones and muscles. The number one symptom of stress fractures is pain. Symptoms of stress fractures in the feet include tenderness and swelling. Stress fractures are common in hands, feet, shins, and the last five vertebrae of the back. Female tennis players are set at higher risk to stress fractures than males.

Wrist and arm stress fractures can lead to greater issues such as tendonitis.

See also 
 Tennis
 Tennis technology
 Tennis statistics

References

Tennis
Sports injuries
Tennis culture